Mariangela Parravicini (born 7 May 1986) is an Italian freestyle skier. She competed in the women's moguls event at the 2006 Winter Olympics.

References

External links
 

1986 births
Living people
Italian female freestyle skiers
Olympic freestyle skiers of Italy
Freestyle skiers at the 2006 Winter Olympics
Sportspeople from the Province of Sondrio
21st-century Italian women